Shit happens is a slang phrase that is used as a simple existential observation that life is full of unpredictable events, similar to "c'est la vie". The phrase is an acknowledgment that bad things happen to people seemingly for no particular reason. The phrase was first observed in 1964, but wasn't used in a print publication until 1983. Alternately said, albeit less vulgarly, as "stuff happens".

History
The fact that people have been remarking that shit happens has been attested from 1964, when Carl Werthman quoted an example in his UC Berkeley masters thesis; the relevant excerpt was published in The American City (edited by Anselm L. Strauss) in 1968.

In a review of Fred Shapiro's 2006 work The Yale Book of Quotations, The New Yorker critic Louis Menand stated that it is "extremely interesting" that the phrase "Shit happens" was introduced to print by Connie Eble, in a publication identified as UNC–CH Slang in 1983.

Seismologists from the U.S. Geological Survey launched an earthquake-readiness campaign in California under the title "Shift Happens". A seismologist commented "Stuff happens and you have to prepared."

See also

References

External links 

English phrases
English-language slang
Comedy catchphrases
Slogans
English profanity
1964 neologisms